The Moyes Ventura is an Australian high-wing, single-place, hang glider that was designed and produced by Moyes Delta Gliders of Botany, New South Wales. Now out of production, when it was available the aircraft was supplied complete and ready-to-fly.

Design and development
The Ventura is a beginner-level hang glider made from aluminum tubing, with the single-surface wing covered in Dacron sailcloth. It was marketed as spin-proof and easy to fly. Options included mylar inserts and a speedbar. The aircraft was produced in two sizes named after its wing area in square feet, to accommodate pilots of different weight ranges.

Variants
Ventura 170
Small-sized model for lighter pilots. Its  span wing is cable braced from a single kingpost.
Ventura 190
Large-sized model for heavier pilots. Its  span wing is cable braced from a single kingpost.

Specifications (Ventura 170)

References

External links

Ventura
Hang gliders